The Southern Railway  (also known as Southern Railway Company and now known as the Norfolk Southern Railway) was a class 1 railroad based in the Southern United States between 1894 and 1982, when it merged with the Norfolk & Western to form Norfolk Southern. The railroad was the product of nearly 150 predecessor lines that were combined, reorganized and recombined beginning in the 1830s, formally becoming the Southern Railway in 1894.

At the end of 1971, the Southern operated  of railroad, not including its Class I subsidiaries Alabama Great Southern (528 miles or ); Central of Georgia (1729 miles); Savannah & Atlanta (167 miles); Cincinnati, New Orleans and Texas Pacific Railway (415 miles); Georgia Southern & Florida (454 miles); and twelve Class II subsidiaries. That year, the Southern itself reported 26,111 million net ton-miles of revenue freight and 110 million passenger-miles. Alabama Great Southern reported 3,854 million net ton-miles of revenue freight and 11 million passenger-miles; Central of Georgia 3,595 and 17; Savannah & Atlanta 140 and 0; Cincinnati, New Orleans and Texas Pacific Railway 4906 and 0.3; and Georgia Southern & Florida 1,431 and 0.3.

The railroad joined forces with the Norfolk and Western Railway (N&W) in 1980 to form the Norfolk Southern Corporation. The Norfolk Southern Corporation was created in response to the creation of the CSX Corporation (its rail system was later transformed to CSX Transportation in 1986). Southern and N&W continued as operating companies of Norfolk Southern until in 1982, when Norfolk Southern merged nearly all of N&W's operations into Southern to form the Norfolk Southern Railway. The railroad has used that name since.

History

Official predecessors
 Richmond, York River and Chesapeake Railroad (1894)
 Richmond and Danville Railroad (1894)
 Memphis and Charleston Railroad (1894)
 East Tennessee, Virginia and Georgia Railway (1894)
 Cincinnati, New Orleans and Texas Pacific Railway (1894)

Creation and independent status

The pioneering South Carolina Canal and Rail Road Company, Southern's earliest predecessor line and one of the first railroads in the United States, was chartered on December 19, 1827, and ran the nation's first regularly scheduled steam-powered passenger train – the wood-burning Best Friend of Charleston – over a six-mile section out of Charleston, South Carolina, on December 25, 1830. By October 1833, its 136-mile line to Hamburg, South Carolina, was the longest in the world. The company leased enslaved African Americans from plantation owners when free white people refused to work in the swamps. The company eventually purchased 89 people to work as slaves.

As railroad fever struck other Southern states, networks gradually spread across the South and even across the Appalachian Mountains. By 1857 the Memphis and Charleston Railroad was completed to link both Charleston, South Carolina, and Memphis, Tennessee. The Western North Carolina Railroad was halted because voters were angry about that law allowed purchasers of private bonds to have the train tracks veer to their towns.  The provision of the laws that allowed this was not repealed until Reconstruction.

Rail expansion in the South was also halted with the start of the Civil War. The Battle of Shiloh, the Siege of Corinth and the Second Battle of Corinth in 1862 were motivated by the importance of the Memphis and Charleston line, the only east–west rail link across the Confederacy. The Chickamauga Campaign for Chattanooga, Tennessee, was also motivated by the importance of its rail connections to the Memphis and Charleston and other lines. Also in 1862 the Richmond and York River Railroad, which operated from the Pamunkey River at West Point, Virginia, to Richmond, Virginia, was a major focus of George McClellan's Peninsular Campaign, which culminated in the Seven Days Battles and devastated the tiny rail link. Late in the war, the Richmond and Danville Railroad was the Confederacy's last link to Richmond, and transported Jefferson Davis and his cabinet to Danville, Virginia, just before the fall of Richmond in April 1865.

Known as the "First Railroad War", the Civil War left the South's railroads and economy devastated. Most of the railroads, however, were repaired, reorganized and operated again. Convict lease was a near continuation of slavery as charges were often only applied to people of African descent. Five-hundred African Americans were assigned to provide back breaking labor on the Western North Carolina Railroad. Men were shipped to and from the worksite in iron shackles and around twenty were drowned in the Tuckasegee River weighted down by their shackles.  In the area along the Ohio River and Mississippi River, construction of new railroads continued throughout Reconstruction. The Richmond and Danville System expanded throughout the South during this period, but was overextended, and came upon financial troubles in 1893, when control was lost to financier J. P. Morgan, who reorganized it into the Southern Railway System.

Southern Railway came into existence in 1894 through the combination of the Memphis and Charleston Railroad, the Richmond and Danville system and the East Tennessee, Virginia and Georgia Railroad. The company owned two-thirds of the 4,400 miles of line it operated, and the rest was held through leases, operating agreements and stock ownership. Southern also controlled the Alabama Great Southern and the Georgia Southern and Florida, which operated separately, and it had an interest in the Central of Georgia. Additionally, the Southern Railway also agreed to lease the North Carolina Railroad Company, providing a critical connection from Virginia to the rest of the southeast via the Carolinas.

Southern's first president, Samuel Spencer, brought more lines into Southern's organized system. During his 12-year term, the railway built new shops at Spencer, North Carolina, Knoxville, Tennessee, and Atlanta, Georgia, upgraded tracks, and purchased more equipment. He moved the company's service away from an agricultural dependence on tobacco and cotton and centered its efforts on diversifying traffic and industrial development. On November 29, 1906, Spencer was killed in a train wreck.

After the line from Meridian, Mississippi, to New Orleans, Louisiana, was acquired in 1916 under Southern's president Fairfax Harrison, the railroad had assembled the 8,000-mile, 13-state system that lasted for almost half a century. Additionally, Southern have operated 6,791 miles of road at the end of 1925, but its flock of subsidiaries added 1000+ more.

In 1912, the Southern Railway leased most of its Bluemont, Virginia, branch to the newly formed Washington and Old Dominion Railway. In 1945, the Southern sold most of the remnant of the branch to the Washington and Old Dominion Railroad, the successor to the Washington and Old Dominion Railway.

The Central of Georgia became part of the system in 1963, and the former Norfolk Southern Railway was acquired in 1974. Despite these small acquisitions, the Southern disdained the merger trend when it swept the railroad industry in the 1960s, choosing to remain a regional carrier. In 1978 President L. Stanley Crane said the refusal to add routes through merger was a mistake, especially the decision not to add a connecting route to Chicago.

The Southern tried to gain access to Chicago by targeting the Monon Railroad and the Chicago and Eastern Illinois Railroad but both those railroads went to Southern's competitor, the Louisville and Nashville Railroad. A decade later Crane tried to rectify the situation by merging with the Illinois Central Railroad. When that failed, he petitioned the Interstate Commerce Commission to give Southern the old Monon routes and the old Atlantic Coast Line route from Jacksonville to Tampa by way of Orlando among other properties as a condition of the I.C.C.'s approval of the Seaboard Coast Line – Chessie System merger in 1979. While the request was supported by the I.C.C.'s Enforcement Bureau, it was ultimately unsuccessful.

Becoming part of the Norfolk Southern Corporation
In response to the creation of the CSX Corporation in November 1980, the Southern Railway joined forces with the Norfolk and Western Railway and formed the Norfolk Southern Corporation in 1980 which began operations in 1982, further consolidating railroads in the eastern half of the United States.

The Southern Railway was renamed Norfolk Southern Railway as the Norfolk and Western Railway became a subsidiary to its system on June 1, 1982. The railroad then acquired more than half of Conrail on June 1, 1999.

Notable features
Southern and its predecessors were responsible for many firsts in the industry. Starting in 1833, its predecessor, the South Carolina Canal and Rail Road, was the first to carry passengers, U.S. troops and mail on steam-powered trains and experimented with railroad lighting.  They had a pine log fire on a flatcar, covered in sand, to provide light at night before inexpensive kerosene was invented for lamps.

In 1941, the Southern Railway went under dieselization and became the first major railroad in the United States to be fully converted from steam to diesel-powered locomotives in 1953. On January 20, 1953, the last steam-powered passenger train arrived in Knoxville, Tennessee. On June 17, 1953, the railroad's last steam-powered freight train arrived in Chattanooga, Tennessee. Although a handful of 63 steam locomotives were still in the Southern's employ in 1954 according to Southern Railway System, Steam Locomotives and Boats by Richard E. Prince.

The Southern Railway was active in mechanization, used bank engines, is widely credited with inventing unit trains for coal and new freight cars, and understood the power of marketing using the promotional phrase "Southern Gives a Green Light to Innovation".

In 1966, a popular steam locomotive excursion program was instituted under the presidency of W. Graham Claytor Jr., and included Southern veteran locomotives No. 630, No. 722, No. 4501, and Savannah & Atlanta No. 750 along with non-Southern locomotives such as Texas & Pacific No. 610, Canadian Pacific No. 2839, and Chesapeake & Ohio No. 2716. The steam program continued after the 1982 merger with the Norfolk and Western to form the Norfolk Southern, through increased operating costs and concerns ended the program in 1994. Norfolk Southern reinstated the steam program on a limited basis from 2011 to 2015, as the 21st Century Steam program.

In the early 2000s, a  loop of former Southern Railway right-of-way encircling central Atlanta neighborhoods was acquired and is now the BeltLine trail.

Passenger trains

Along with its famed (Southern) Crescent and Southerner, the Southern's other named passenger trains included:
 Aiken-Augusta Special
 Airline Belle
 Asheville Special
 Birmingham Special
 Carolina Special
 Fast Mail "Old 97"
 Florida Sunbeam
 Goldenrod
 Kansas City–Florida Special
 Land of the Sky Special
 Memphis Special
 New Yorker
 Peach Queen
 Pelican
 Piedmont Limited
 Ponce de Leon
 Queen and Crescent Limited
 Royal Palm
 Skyland Special
 Sunnyland
 Tennessean

The Southern Railway also handled ticket sales and operations for subsidiary railroads, such as:
 The Nancy Hanks (operated by Central of Georgia Railway)
 The Man O' War (operated by Central of Georgia Railway)

The Southern Railway also participated in the operation of the City of Miami, which was operated by the Southern Railway over the Central of Georgia trackage from Birmingham, Alabama, to Albany, Georgia, where it traded off with the Seaboard Coast Line until its discontinuation in 1971.

When Amtrak took over most intercity rail service in 1971, Southern initially opted out of turning over its passenger routes to the new organization. However, it shared operation of its flagship train, the New Orleans–New York Southern Crescent, with Amtrak. Under a longstanding haulage agreement inherited from Penn Central and the Pennsylvania Railroad, Amtrak carried the train north of Washington. By the late 1970s, growing revenue losses and equipment-replacement expenses convinced Southern it could not continue in the passenger business. It handed full control of its passenger routes to Amtrak in 1979.

Roads owned by the Southern Railway
 Alabama Great Southern Railway (AGS)
 Albany and Northern Railway (A&N)
 Atlantic & Eastern Carolina Railway (A&EC)
 Birmingham Terminal Company
 Camp Lejeune Railroad Company
 Carolina and Northwestern Railway (C&NW)
 Central of Georgia Railway (CofG)(CG)
 Cincinnati, New Orleans and Texas Pacific Railway (CNO&TP)
 Chattanooga Station Company
 Chattanooga Traction Company (CTC)
 Georgia and Florida Railroad (G&F)
 Georgia Ashburn Sylvester and Camilla Railway (GAS&C)
 Georgia Northern Railway (GANO) – acquired in 1967
 Georgia Southern and Florida Railway (GS&F)
 Interstate Railroad (INT)
 Kentucky and Indiana Terminal Railroad (K&IT)
 Sievern and Knoxville Railroad
 Live Oak Perry and Gulf Railway (LOP&G)
 Louisiana Southern Railway (LS)
 New Orleans and North Eastern Railway (NO&NE)
 New Orleans Terminal Company (NOTCO)
 Norfolk Southern Railway (NS)
 Savannah & Atlanta Railway (SA)
 Saint John's River Terminal Company (SJRT)
 State University Railroad Company (54%)
 South Georgia Railway (SG)
 Tennessee, Alabama and Georgia Railway (TA&G)
 Tennessee Railway (TENN)

Major railroad yards
 Chattanooga, Tennessee – DeButts Yard (formerly Citico Yard)
 Atlanta, Georgia – Inman Yard
 Spencer, North Carolina – Spencer Yard
 Birmingham, Alabama – Norris Yard
 Knoxville, Tennessee – Sevier Yard
 Macon, Georgia – Brosnan Yard
 Sheffield, Alabama – Sheffield Yard
 Alexandria, Virginia – Potomac Yard

Company officers
Presidents of the Southern Railway:
 Samuel Spencer (1894–1906)
 William Finley (1906–1913)
 Fairfax Harrison (1913–1937)
 Ernest E. Norris (1937–1951)
 Harry A. DeButts (1951–1962)
 D. William Brosnan (1962–1967)
 W. Graham Claytor Jr. (1967–1977)
 L. Stanley Crane (1977–1980)
 Harold H. Hall (1980–1982)

Heritage unit
To mark its 30th anniversary, Norfolk Southern painted 20 new locomotives with the paint schemes of predecessor railroads. GE ES44AC #8099 was painted in Southern Railway's green and white livery.

See also

 FM OP800
 Southern Railway's Spencer Shops

References

Bibliography

Further reading

 
 Harrison, Fairfax.  A History of the Legal Development of the Railroad System of Southern Railway Company.  Washington, D.C.:  1901.

External links

 Southern Railway Historical Association covers Southern Railway history
 , which was replaced by a map version on AbandonedRails.com.

 
Predecessors of the Norfolk Southern Railway
Former Class I railroads in the United States
Standard gauge railways in the United States
Defunct Alabama railroads
Defunct Florida railroads
Defunct Georgia (U.S. state) railroads
Defunct Mississippi railroads
Defunct Tennessee railroads
Railway companies established in 1894
Railway companies disestablished in 1990
Defunct Missouri railroads
Defunct Illinois railroads
Defunct Kentucky railroads
Defunct Indiana railroads
Defunct Virginia railroads
Defunct South Carolina railroads
Defunct North Carolina railroads
Defunct Washington, D.C., railroads